John of Constantinople (died 839) was an abbot of the Cathares Monastery, in Constantinople. He clashed with Emperor Leo the Armenian, who was instituting a policy of iconoclasm. John survived torture. He is considered a saint by the Catholic and Eastern Orthodox churches, and is celebrated by them respectively on April 18 and April 27.

References

813 deaths
9th-century Christian saints
9th-century Byzantine monks
Byzantine Iconoclasm
Year of birth unknown